The Albatros was built by one Henri Villouin of Paris in 1912. His company made mostly cycles and motorcycles, but did build a light 4-cylinder car. Their advertisement boasted of '91 wins in 92 races', but this is thought to be referring to the cycles.

References
Georgano, G.N., "Albatros", in G.N. Georgano, ed., The Complete Encyclopedia of Motorcars 1885-1968  (New York: E.P. Dutton and Co., 1974), pp. 31.

Defunct motor vehicle manufacturers of France